Kanak Manjari Institute of Pharmaceutical Sciences, also known as KMIPS, is a well-known pharmaceutical sciences institute  in the  Indian State of Odisha. It was established in 1982 in Chhend Colony, Rourkela to teach  Pharmaceutical Sciences and to award diplomas as well as undergraduate and postgraduate degrees to students around the state.

The institute is affiliated with the All India Council of Technical Education and functions under Biju Patnaik University of Technology, Rourkela recognized by the state government of Odisha. It is a constituent of Kanak Manarji Trust.

Courses offered
The college awards a Diploma of Pharmacy (D.Pharm) through a three-year curriculum, as well as a Bachelor of Pharmacy (B.Pharm) following a four-year undergraduate program. D.Pharm holders are eligible for admission to the B.Pharm program via lateral entry in the second year.

The institute also offers a five-year postgraduate Master of Pharmacy (M.Pharm) degree  with the disciplines of:
M.Pharm in Pharmaceutics
M.Pharm in Pharmacology
M.Pharm in Pharmaceutical Biotechnology
M.Pharm in Pharmaceutical Chemistry
M.Pharm in Pharmaceutical Analysis & Quality Assurance

Intake capacity
For D.Pharm, B.Pharm & M.Pharm.

Admission procedure
The students for postgraduate courses in M.Pharm and B.Pharm are admitted through OJEE national level entrance examination. Students can also get admission through their score for the GPATanother national level entrance examination, conducted by NTA(National Testing Agency) in India for the entrance of postgraduate courses.

Eligibility: for M.Pharm Degree:The candidate should have a graduate degree in any of the streams of B.Pharm.for B.Pharm & D.Pharm Degree:The Candidate should have a Higher Senior Secondary certificate, which is equivalent to CHSE, AISSCE and ISC

Placements

The Training and Placement Cell helps the students to be placed in multinational companies (MNCs) and Indian Companies.

References

External links

Official website of KIMPS Rourkela
 Kanak Manjari Institute of Pharmaceutical Sciences in Google Maps

Pharmacy schools in India
Universities and colleges in Rourkela
Colleges affiliated with Biju Patnaik University of Technology
Educational institutions established in 1982
1982 establishments in Orissa